Mukhlis Nakata (born 12 May 1988) is an Indonesian professional footballer who plays as a midfielder for Persiraja Banda Aceh. He is also the captain for the team since 2016.

Club career

Persiraja Banda Aceh
Mukhlis spends his whole football career at Persiraja. He started playing for the senior team as a winger in Liga Indonesia Premier Division for 2008-09 season. The following season, he played on a regular basis under the head coach Herry Kiswanto, and helped Persiraja win the promotion to Indonesian Premier League, the highest tier in Indonesian League at that time.

In 2011-12 Indonesian Premier League opening game versus Persija Jakarta, he came in from the bench substituting Defri Rizky. He established himself in regular first team and was featured in several games, such as when Persiraja defeated Persibo Bojonegoro 1-0. Persiraja finished 7th (out of 12 teams) this season.

In 2013 Indonesian Premier League, he played regularly for Persiraja. However, Persiraja were relegated this season, as they only finished 5th in the play-off round and did not qualify to Indonesian Super League (note: 2013 was the last season of Indonesian Premier League played as the highest tier league, before merged with Indonesian Super League in the following season). And ever since, he plays for Persiraja in the second tier league.

Honours

Club
Persiraja
 Liga Indonesia Premier Division runner-up: 2010-11
 Liga 2 third place: 2019

References

External links
 Mukhlis Nakata at Soccerway
 Mukhlis Nakata at Liga Indonesia

Living people
1988 births
Indonesian footballers
Association football midfielders
Persiraja Banda Aceh players
Sportspeople from Aceh
People from Aceh Besar Regency